Tamaz Pertia (born 23 December 1974) is a former Georgian football midfielder, currently a manager with FK Liepāja in the Latvian Higher League.

Playing career

During his playing career, Pertia has played for Lokomotiv Minsk in the Belarusian Premier League and many clubs from Georgia, Moldova and Latvia.

Coaching career

In 2008 Pertia became the manager of Dinaburg Daugavpils – his previous club.
On 2 June 2010 he became the manager of Daugava Daugavpils. Pertia left the club in July 2011 after the change of club's chairman and was succeeded by Leonid Nazarenko.

In August 2011 he accepted an offer to become the manager of JFK Olimps. After the club's relegation from the Latvian Higher League Pertia left the club, becoming the charmain of Skonto Riga youth academy. In 2012 Pertia succeeded Vitālijs Astafjevs as the manager of Skonto-2.

In December 2012, after Marians Pahars had left the club, Pertia accepted an offer to become the manager of Skonto Riga first team.

In November 2016 he became the manager of Latvian Higher League team FK Liepāja.

References

External links

Tamaz Pertia at Footballdatabase

1974 births
Living people
Footballers from Georgia (country)
Association football midfielders
Expatriate footballers from Georgia (country)
Expatriate footballers in Ukraine
Expatriate sportspeople from Georgia (country) in Ukraine
Expatriate footballers in Latvia
Expatriate footballers in Moldova
Expatriate footballers in Bulgaria
Expatriate footballers in Belarus
Ukrainian Premier League players
Expatriate sportspeople from Georgia (country) in Latvia
Expatriate sportspeople from Georgia (country) in Moldova
FC Dinamo Tbilisi players
FC Guria Lanchkhuti players
FC Metalurgi Rustavi players
FC Temp Shepetivka players
FC Merani Tbilisi players
FK Ventspils players
FC Sheriff Tiraspol players
FC Dunav Ruse players
FK Rīga players
Dinaburg FC players
FC Daugava players
FC SKVICH Minsk players
Football managers from Georgia (country)
Expatriate football managers in Latvia
FC Daugava managers
JFK Olimps managers
Skonto FC managers
Expatriate sportspeople from Georgia (country) in Belarus
Expatriate sportspeople from Georgia (country) in Bulgaria
Footballers from Tbilisi
Erovnuli Liga players